The plumbeous warbler (Setophaga plumbea) is a species of bird in the family Parulidae. It is found only in Dominica and Guadeloupe. Its natural habitats are subtropical or tropical dry forest and subtropical or tropical moist lowland forest.

References

Setophaga
Endemic birds of the Caribbean
Birds of Dominica
Birds of Guadeloupe
Birds described in 1878
Taxonomy articles created by Polbot